Piotr Machalica (13 February 1955 – 14 December 2020) was a Polish theatrical and cinematic actor.

Biography
Machalica was born into a family of actors. His father, Henryk Machalica and his brother,  were both actors. Machalica had two children with his first wife Małgorzata Machalica, Sonia and Franciszek, before the couple divorced. He then dated actress  for a time before he married Aleksandra Sosnowska on 19 September 2020.

Machalica finished his studies at the Aleksander Zelwerowicz National Academy of Dramatic Arts in Warsaw in 1981. He first began acting in productions at the Teatr Powszechny w Warszawie. He also embarked on a short singing career and received an award at the 1986 National Festival of Polish Song in Opole. He notably sang songs by Bulat Okudzhava and Georges Brassens. From 2006 to 2018, he served as artistic director of the Teatr im. Adama Mickiewicza w Częstochowie.

In 2013, Machalica underwent a life-saving heart operation. He died from COVID-19 in Warsaw on 14 December 2020, at the age of 65, during the COVID-19 pandemic in Poland.

Filmography
Rycerz (1979)
Medium (1985)
Zabij mnie glino (1987)
Dekalog 9 (1988)
A Short Film About Love (1988)
Maria Curie (1990)
The Please Principle (2019)

Discography

Solo
Portret muzyczny: Brassens i Okudżawa (2002)
Moje chmury płyną nisko (2012)
Piaskownica (2015)
Mój ulubiony Młynarski (2019)

Duo
Kuba Blokesz (2015)

References

1955 births
2020 deaths
20th-century Polish actors
21st-century Polish actors
Deaths from the COVID-19 pandemic in Poland
People from Pszczyna
Polish male television actors
Polish male film actors
Polish male voice actors
Recipient of the Meritorious Activist of Culture badge